Edmond-François Calvo (26 August 1892 - 11 October 1957) was a French comics artist.

Born in 1892 in Elbeuf, France, he was in the army in the First World War, and started publishing cartoons in the 1920s. He had many different jobs, including working as a woodcarver and an innkeeper, until 1938, when he became a full-time artist. Most of his work had animals as the main characters, which together with his popularity and productivity gave him the nickname "The French Walt Disney".

His best known work is La bête est morte (started clandestinely in 1942, published as a book after the liberation in two parts in 1944-1945), a satire on the second World War with the different countries depicted as different animals, a system that would later be used by Art Spiegelman in his graphic novel Maus. The story was written by Victor Dancette and Jacques Zimmermann, and the comic was translated in English and Dutch. Other well-known works include Patamousse (1943-1946), about a rabbit, and Rosalie from 1946, where the main character wasn't an animal but a living car. Cricri souris d'appartement became the eponymous series for Cricri magazine. His last major series was Moustache et Trottinette (1952-1958), which was continued after his death by Jean Trubert.

He also contributed cartoons to satirical magazines like Le Canard enchaîné, and was active as a sculptor.

Calvo died in 1957 in the 20th arrondissement of Paris.

Calvo's graphical style, while often admired, has not really been influential. Only Albert Uderzo, the artist of Asterix, was directly influenced by Calvo after visiting him while still young.

Bibliography
This is a list of published books of his work, not the many other works he made for newspapers or magazines.
1939: Robin des Bois (reprinted 1949)
1941: Les Voyages de Gulliver
1943: Un chasseur sachant chasser
1943-1946: Patamousse, 3 albums, written by Calvo
1944-45: La bête est morte, translated in Dutch (1946, reprint 1977)
1944: Croquemulot
1946: Rosalie, reprinted in 2012 by Gallimard
1946: Mr. Loyal
1946: Anatomies atomiques
1947: Cendrillon et le Petit Chaperon rouge
1947: La Belle au bois dormant
1947: Souricette
1947-1948: Le Petit Poucet, 2 albums
1948: Le chevalier du feu
1949; Don Quichotte
1953-1955: Coquin le Petit Cocker, 5 albums, written by Marijac
1956-1960: Moustache et Trottinette, 14 albums, written by Calvo, translated in Dutch (2 albums)
1957: Cricri souris d'appartement, 2 albums, written by Marijac

Notes

1892 births
1957 deaths
French comics artists